Enrico Cibelli (born 14 July 1987) is a Sammarinese footballer. He plays as a midfielder for Tre Penne and formerly the San Marino national football team.

References

Living people
Sammarinese footballers
1987 births
Place of birth missing (living people)
Campionato Sammarinese di Calcio players
Association football midfielders
San Marino international footballers